Sébastien Rouault (born 24 February 1986) is a male freestyle swimmer from France, who competed for his native country at the 2008 Summer Olympics in Beijing, China.

See also

 List of University of Georgia people

External links
 

1986 births
Living people
People from Le Chesnay
Swimmers at the 2008 Summer Olympics
Olympic swimmers of France
French male freestyle swimmers
World Aquatics Championships medalists in swimming
European Aquatics Championships medalists in swimming
Georgia Bulldogs men's swimmers
Mediterranean Games gold medalists for France
Mediterranean Games silver medalists for France
Mediterranean Games bronze medalists for France
Swimmers at the 2005 Mediterranean Games
Sportspeople from Yvelines
Mediterranean Games medalists in swimming